There are at least 75 waterfalls in the U.S. state of Utah.

Utah
Waterfalls